Threnosia is a genus of moths in the subfamily Arctiinae.

Species
 Threnosia agraphes Turner, 1940
 Threnosia heminephes Meyrick, 1886
 Threnosia hypopolia Turner, 1940
 Threnosia myochroa Turner, 1940

Former species
 Threnosia adrasta Turner, 1940

References

Natural History Museum Lepidoptera generic names catalog

Lithosiini
Moth genera